The 1963 San Diego State Aztecs football team represented San Diego State College during the 1963 NCAA College Division football season.

San Diego State competed in the California Collegiate Athletic Association (CCAA). The team was led by head coach Don Coryell, in his third year, and played home games at Aztec Bowl. They finished the season with seven wins and two losses (7–2, 4–1 CCAA) and claimed the CCAA conference championship. For the year, the offense averaged over 35 points a game, totaling 317 points. The defense gave up an average of 13 points a game, totaling 118 in 9 games.

Schedule

Team players in the NFL/AFL
The following San Diego State players were selected in the 1964 NFL Draft.

The following San Diego State players were selected in the 1964 AFL Draft.

The following finished their San Diego State career in 1963, were not drafted, but played in the NFL/AFL.

Team awards

Notes

References

San Diego State
San Diego State Aztecs football seasons
San Diego State Aztecs football